Goodland is an unincorporated community in Knox County, in the U.S. state of Missouri.

History
A post office called Goodland was established in 1854, and remained in operation until 1873. The community bears the surname of a pioneer citizen.

References

Unincorporated communities in Knox County, Missouri
Unincorporated communities in Missouri